The Gottleuba Valley railway was the second railway line to be built in Saxony as a Sekundärbahn. It ran along the Gottleuba valley from Pirna via Berggießhübel to  Bad Gottleuba and was closed in 1976.

Sources 
 Moritz Fischer: Wanderungen durch das Gottleubatal. Verlag Friedrich Axt. Dresden 1881.
 Rainer Fischer: Pirna – Gottleuba und Pirna – Großcotta. in: Wolf-Dieter Machel (Hrsg.): Neben- und Schmalspurbahnen in Deutschland. GeraNova Zeitschriftenverlag. München 1996.
 Rainer Fischer: Sekundärbahnen von Pirna nach Großcotta und Gottleuba. Verlag Kenning. Nordhorn 1998, .
 Tobias Nitsche, Jens Herbach: 100 Jahre Eisenbahn Pirna – Gottleuba. Dresden 2005. (Eigenverlag)
 Erich Preuß, Rainer Preuß: Sächsische Staatseisenbahnen. transpress Verlagsgesellschaft mbH. Berlin 1991.

External links 

 The former branch line in the Gottleuba valley
 Information about the line at www.sachsenschiene.de
 Information about the line at www.lokomotive.de
 Society for the Preservation of Verein Langenhennersdorf Station

References 

Railway lines in Saxony
Transport in Saxon Switzerland